The Lausanne bus network has 34 regular bus lines including 11 trolley, 23 urban, and five regional.

City lines

Regional lines

See also
 Lausanne Metro
 Public transport in the Lausanne Region

References

External links
 Network maps indicating fare zones
 Individual Bus Line Route Maps

Transport in Lausanne